The Gulf States Marine Fisheries Commission (GSMFC) is an interstate compact among the five U.S. states that border the Gulf of Mexico: Alabama, Florida, Louisiana, Mississippi and Texas. Its purpose is to promote the conservation, development and utilization of the fishery resources of the gulf.

The GSMFC was created on July 16, 1949, and is headquartered in Ocean Springs, Mississippi.

References

External links
Official website

Fisheries agencies
1949 establishments in the United States
Government agencies established in 1949
Alabama law
Florida law
Louisiana law
Mississippi law
Texas law
United States interstate compacts